Arkansas Highway 56 (AR 56 and Hwy. 56) is an east–west state highway in Sharp and Izard Counties. The route runs  from Arkansas Highway 5 in Calico Rock east and south to Poughkeepsie.

Route description
AR 56 begins in Calico Rock at Arkansas Highway 5, running north to Pineville. In Pineville, AR 56 serves as the southern terminus for AR 223, which runs north to Missouri.
The route continues to run east through rural country to meet AR 9 in Brockwell near the historic Pine Ridge School Building and AR 289 in Franklin south of Horseshoe Bend. After Franklin, the route enters Sharp County, and a concurrency begins south with US 167 south of Ash Flat. AR 56 follows US 167 south  for  until Evening Shade, when AR 56 turns east. The highway continues east to AR 58 in Poughkeepsie, where the route terminates near the Poughkeepsie School Building on the National Register of Historic Places.

History

Arkansas Highway 56 was one of the original 1926 Arkansas state highways. The route ran from Calico Rock to Ash Flat, terminating at AR 11. The modern alignment follows this alignment very closely, with one exception. The Evening Shade – Poughkeepsie segment was added to the state highway system in 1965 as an unpaved route, which was paved in 1986.
US 167 was extended north in 1938, replacing AR 11 in the area. Most of the western segment was repaved around 2002.

Major intersections
Mile markers reset at concurrencies.

See also

 List of state highways in Arkansas

References

External links

056
Transportation in Sharp County, Arkansas
Transportation in Izard County, Arkansas